Dextranase (EC 3.2.1.11, dextran hydrolase, endodextranase, dextranase DL 2, DL 2, endo-dextranase, α-D-1,6-glucan-6-glucanohydrolase, 1,6-α-D-glucan 6-glucanohydrolase) is an enzyme with systematic name 6-α-D-glucan 6-glucanohydrolase. It catalyses the following chemical reaction

 Endohydrolysis of (1→6)-α-D-glucosidic linkages in dextran

References

External links 

EC 3.2.1